Disney Junior (formerly Playhouse Disney) was a Southeast Asian pay television preschool channel owned by The Walt Disney Company Asia-Pacific.

Aimed mainly at children between ages 2 to 7 years old, its programming consisted of original first-run television series and theatrically released and made-for-DVD movies, as well as other select third-party programming, some of which originally having aired on PBS Kids in the United States.

Disney Junior also lent its name to an early morning program block seen on sister network Disney Channel, branded as Disney Junior on Disney Channel until it discontinued since July 31, 2018, using the Disney Channel moniker. The preschool channel ceased operations at the end of 2021.

History 
Negotiations for an Asian version of Playhouse Disney started in 2000 as a block on Disney Channel. It was first broadcast in Hong Kong and Indonesia as Playhouse Disney on April 2, 2004. From 2004 to 2005, Disney launched Playhouse Disney in several countries in Southeast Asia. In the Philippines, the channel was broadcast in English language without the usage of native Tagalog.

On 30 June 2011, Laura Wendt, announced that Playhouse Disney will be rebranded as Disney Junior in Southeast Asia and Hong Kong on 11 July 2011. Laura said that Disney Junior will feature the hallmarks of the Disney brand, story, and character. They will take classic Disney characters, beloved, through generations, and bring them to life on TV with elements that encourage early childhood learning.

Due to increasing localization of the Indian feeds of Disney Channel and Disney XD, they were banned from broadcasting in Bangladesh in 2013. Later, in 2016, the Southeast Asian feeds of the Disney channels, including Disney Junior Asia, became available on certain cable operators in Bangladesh.

On March 1, 2016, Disney Junior changed to its widescreen format in some countries, while launching its high-definition channel.

On 31 July 2018, the Disney Junior on Disney Channel block was discontinued with no explanation given.

Closure 
On 1 June 2020, Disney Channel, Disney XD and Disney Junior ceased transmission in Singapore on both Singtel and StarHub after failing the contract renewal with both service providers in the country. Select programs from these 3 channels were moved to, replaced by and made it available via Disney+ on 23 February 2021.

On 5 August 2020, Disney Junior upgraded to HD on Astro alongside Disney Channel. On 1 January 2021, the channels ceased operations across Astro and Astro-owned TV providers (including NJOI and Kristal-Astro) in Malaysia due to the launch of Astro's Refreshed Kids Pack, while airing PJ Masks, that announced back on 14 December 2020. While its shows moved to Disney+ Hotstar in the said country on 1 June 2021.

After 17 years of broadcasting, Disney Junior Asia, Disney Junior Hong Kong, Disney Channel Asia, Disney Channel Hong Kong along with Fox channels in Southeast Asia have closed on 1 October 2021, at exactly 1:00 am (UTC+08:00)/12:00 am (UTC+07:00), concluding with Mira, Royal Detective.

Most of Disney Junior shows will be shown instead on Disney+ Hotstar and Disney+ depends on its countries. Nevertheless, Disney Junior Taiwan block on Disney Channel, along with the Nat Geo channels, will continue to operate after this date. But the block ended at New Year's Eve (31 December 2021).

Final Feeds
 Main: Available in the Philippines, Indonesia, Thailand, Papua New Guinea, Myanmar, Bangladesh, and Vietnam. It was formerly provided in Singapore and Malaysia. It ceased operations on October 1, 2021.
 Hong Kong: Available in Hong Kong with its own schedule differing from the main pan-Asian feed. It broadcast in both Cantonese and English language. Along with the pan-Asian feed, it ceased operations on October 1, 2021, due to the launch of Disney+ on November 16 of that year.
 Taiwan: Available in Taiwan with its own TV block on Disney Channel, runs from 6 am to 1 pm (UTC+08:00). It broadcast in Taiwanese Mandarin and English, and it also aired continuities and promos. It ceased operations on December 31, 2021, due to the launch of Disney+ on November 12 of that year.

Programming

Disney Junior Magazine Philippines 
Disney Junior Magazine Philippines (known as Disney Junior Magazine and formerly known as Playhouse Disney Magazine Philippines) was an educational magazine published in the Philippines by Summit Media in collaboration with The Walt Disney Company Southeast Asia.

References

Asia
Children's television channels in the Asia Pacific
Defunct television channels
Commercial-free television networks
Television programming blocks in Asia
Television channels and stations established in 2004
Television channels and stations disestablished in 2021
Mass media in Southeast Asia
English-language television stations
Television channel articles with incorrect naming style